Waris Shah: Ishq Daa Waaris is a 2006 Indian Punjabi language film, directed by Manoj Punj, starring Gurdas Maan, Juhi Chawla and Divya Dutta in lead roles. It is about the life of legendary Punjabi poet Waris Shah during the times when he wrote the poem Heer. The movie was internationally acclaimed and won four awards at 54th National Film Awards.

Plot
Mughal Ruler Aurangzeb bans music in India, since he believes that music turns a person away from God. This ban continues in the next generations. Music lovers and singers start living in secret places away from cities. Baba Makhdum (Mukesh Rishi) is staying near Kasur with some of his followers and practices music; Waris Shah (Gurdas Maan) comes and joins him. Baba Makhdum tells Waris that he appreciates his talent, but asks Waris to feel the pain in order to get best out of him.

On Baba Ji's suggestion Waris moves to the village of Malkan Hans, where music is not banned. The Mughal Ruler finds out about Baba Makhdum and kills him. Waris Shah meets Bhaagpari (Juhi Chawla) in Malkan Hans. The two fall in love. Saabo (Divya Dutta), too, gets attracted to Waris Shah, and is willing to do anything to get Waris. Waris starts living in the masjid of the village and starts working on the poem Heer. Village youngsters get attracted to his work and become his fans.

The Qazi (Gurkirtan) of the village becomes furious after seeing Waris's popularity. Waris is arrested by the area Subedar after complaints from the Qazi. Waris convinces the Subedar that by singing he is worshiping God. Bhaagpari is forced to marry Saabo's brother (Sushant Singh) as they were betrothed at a young age. Waris Shah realizes that in order to feel pain and complete Heer, he must let Bhaagpari go. On the other hand, Saabo tries her best but fails to get Waris. Finally she accepts her fate and lets Waris go. Waris and Bhaagpari are accused of having a sexual relationship without marriage. They prove their innocence by walking unharmed on burning coals. In the end Waris leaves the village upon the completion of Heer.

Cast

Awards 
The film won the maximum number of awards (4) at the 54th National Film Awards  along with Lage Raho Munna Bhai. It won Best Feature Film in Punjabi (received by Producer: Sai Productions, Director: Manoj Punj), Best Male Playback Singer (awarded to Gurdas Maan - "Couplets of Heer"), Best Art Direction (presented to Rashid Rangrez) and Best Costume Design (felicitated to Manjeet Maan).

Music 
Waris Shah: Ishq Daa Waaris featured 8 soundtracks that were composed by Jaidev Kumar. In the film, the characters of Waris Shah, Bhagpari, and Saabo are seen singing frequently on the screen. Being a respected singer, Gurdas Maan sang for himself, while Alka Yagnik and Kavita Krishnamurthy lent their voices to Juhi Chawla and Divya Dutta respectively. Krishna Beura dubbed for a song picturized on Mukesh Rishi.

See also 

Waaris Shah

References

External links
 

2006 films
Punjabi-language Indian films
Films set in the Mughal Empire
Films whose production designer won the Best Production Design National Film Award
Films that won the Best Costume Design National Film Award
Best Punjabi Feature Film National Film Award winners
Heer Ranjha
Films set in the 18th century
Indian epic films
2000s Punjabi-language films